The 2004 AP Tourism Hyderabad Open was a Tier 4 women's professional tennis tournament on the 2004 WTA Tour. It was the second edition of the tournament and was held from 16 through 21 February 2004. Nicole Pratt won the singles title.

Champions
Singles

  Nicole Pratt defeated  Maria Kirilenko, 7–6(7–3), 6–1

Doubles

  Liezel Huber /  Sania Mirza defeated  Li Ting /  Sun Tiantian, 7–6(7–1), 6–4

Entrants

Seeds

 The following players were seeded

Other entrants
The following players received Wildcards into the main draw
  Isha Lakhani
  Sania Mirza

The following players got entry from the Qualifying Draw
  Ankita Bhambri
  Shahar Pe'er
  Barbara Schwartz
  Neha Uberoi

References

2004 WTA Tour
2004 in Indian tennis
Bangalore Open